The 2015 PartyPoker.net Mosconi Cup, the 22nd edition of the annual nine-ball pool competition between teams representing Europe and the United States, took place 7–10 December 2015 at the Tropicana in Las Vegas, Nevada.

Team Europe retained the Mosconi Cup by defeating Team USA 11–7.


Teams

Results

Monday, 7 December
Day review:

Tuesday, 8 December
Day review:

Wednesday, 9 December
Day review:

Thursday, 10 December
Day review:

References

External links
 Official homepage

2015
2015 in cue sports
2015 in American sports
2015 in sports in Nevada
Sports competitions in Las Vegas
December 2015 sports events in the United States
Mosconi Cup 2015